Juva (also ) is a municipality of Finland. It is located in the Southern Savonia region some  North-East of Helsinki. It was founded on 19 January 1442, and is the oldest parish/municipality in Finland whose exact date of birth is known. At the time, it was only the second parish in Eastern Finland, and later, several other parishes were separated from it, such as Sääminki, (present-day Savonlinna), Kuopio, Pieksämäki and Joroinen. Secular municipal administration was established in 1868.

It is mainly an agricultural community, but possesses also some industries, notably WS Bookwell, a major printing press in Finland.

The municipality is unilingually Finnish.

Lake Jukajärvi is located in Juva municipality.

Culture
Juva is known to be the place of origin of the industrial metal band Ruoska.

References

External links

Municipality of Juva – Official website

 
Populated places established in the 1440s